The Anima Nipissing River, also known as the Red Squirrel River, is a river in Nipissing District, Ontario, Canada. It is situated in Aston and Banting townships of the municipality of Temagami.

Course

See also
List of rivers of Ontario

References

External links

Rivers of Temagami